was a Japanese film director known for his comedy films. Born in Akita Prefecture, he entered Shōchiku's Kamata studio in 1922 and debuted as a director in 1926. He later worked at the Shintoho and Toho studios. He became known as the "god of comedy" for directing over 200 films, many of which were nonsense comedies featuring famous clowns such as Ken'ichi Enomoto, Roppa Furukawa, and Junzaburo Ban.

Filmography 
His works include:
 Akeyuku Sora (1929)
 Wasei Kingu Kongu (1933)
 Kodakara Sodo (1935)
 Akireta musume-tachi, alternate title: (金語楼の子宝騒動) (1949)
 Nodo jimankyō jidai (1949)
 Odoroki ikka (1949)
 Akogare no Hawaii Kōro (1950)
 Aozora tenshi (1950)
 Tennō no Bōshi (天皇の帽子) (1950) jointly directed with Masaki Mori (:ja:毛利正樹)
 Tokyo Kid (1950)
 Tonbo kaeri dōchū (1950)
 Unusual trip to Hawaii (Hawai chindochu) (1954)
 Ukare Gitsune Senbon Zakura'' (1954)

See also
 List of Japanese film directors

References

External links 
 

Japanese film directors
1905 births
1982 deaths
People from Akita Prefecture